Lacey may refer to:

People

Surname

A–L
 Andrew Lacey (1887–1946), Australian politician 
 Bill Lacey (American football) (born 1971), American football player and coach
 Bill Lacey (footballer) (1889–1969), Irish footballer
 Bob Lacey (born 1953), American baseball player
 Bruce Lacey (1927–2016), British inventor
 Catherine Lacey (1904–1979), English actress
 Denzil Lacey (born 1990), Irish radio presenter
 Deon Lacey (born 1990), American football player
 Dermot Lacey (born 1960), Irish politician 
 Des Lacey (1925–1974), Irish footballer
 Dinny Lacey (1890–1923), Irish Republican 
 Edmund Lacey (died 1455), English bishop
 Edward S. Lacey (1835–1916), American politician
 Francis Lacey (1859–1946), English cricketer
 Frederick Bernard Lacey (1920–2017), American judge
 Genevieve Lacey (born 1972), Australian recorder player
 Ian Lacey (born 1984), Australian rugby league player
 Ingrid Lacey (born 1958), British actress
 Isaac Lacey (1776–1844), New York politician
 James Harry Lacey (1917–1989), RAF officer and WW2 flying ace
 Janet Lacey (1903–1988), English charity director and philanthropist 
 Jesse Lacey (born 1978), American musician
 Jim Lacey (1934–2008), Australian zoo manager
 John F. Lacey (1841–1913), American politician
 John Lacey (general) (1755–1814), American military officer
 Lionel Lacey (born 1958), pen name of Lionel Fogarty, Aboriginal Australian poet and activist

M–Z
 Margaret Lacey (1910–1988), Welsh actress
 Martin Lacey (born 1947), British animal trainer, owner of the Great British Circus
 Martin Lacey Jr. (born 1977), son of Martin Lacey, British animal trainer
 Michael Lacey (editor), American editor 
 Michael Lacey (mathematician), American mathematician
 Michael Pearse Lacey (born 1916), Canadian bishop
 Nicola Lacey (born 1958), British legal scholar
 Rebecca Lacey (born 1969), British actress
 Richard Lacey, British air marshal
 Rob Lacey (1962–2006), English author
 Robert Lacey (born 1944), British historian and biographer
 Ronald Lacey (1935–1991), English actor
 Rubin Lacey (1901–1972), American musician
 Sam Lacey (1948–2014), American basketball player
 Sergeant Lacey, American military interrogator 
 Simon Lacey (born 1975), English cricketer
 Tiff Lacey, British singer
 Tori Lacey, British weather forecaster 
 Tyrel Lacey (born 1986), American soccer player
 V'Keon Lacey (born 1988), American football player
 William Lacey (born 1973), British conductor

First name
 Lacey (wrestler) (born 1983), American professional wrestler
 Lacey Baker (born 1991), American skateboarder
 Lacey Baldwin Smith (1922–2013), Historian 
 Lacey Brown (born 1985), American Idol finalist
 Lacey Chabert (born 1982), American actress
 Lacey Dancer (born 1948), American author
 Lacey Evans (born 1990), American professional wrestler
 Lacey Fosburgh (1942–1993), American journalist and author
 Lacey Hearn (1881–1969), American runner
 Lacey Robert Johnson (1854–1915), Canadian engineer
 Lacey Nymeyer (born 1985), American swimmer
 Lacey Putney (1928–2017), American politician 
 Lacey Schwimmer (born 1988), American dancer
 Lacey Sturm (born 1981), American singer
 Lacey Turner (born 1988), English actress
 Lacey Von Erich (born 1986), American professional wrestler
 Lacey Wildd (born 1968), American model and actress

Places
 Lacey, Washington
 Lacey Green (disambiguation), a number of places in the UK
 Lacey Township, New Jersey

Other
 Lacey Act of 1900, conservation law in the United States that prohibits trade in wildlife, fish, and plants
 "Lacey" (Once Upon a Time), a 2013 television episode
 "Mr Lacey", a song by Fairport Convention, from their 1969 album What We Did on Our Holidays, dedicated to inventor Bruce Lacey

See also
 
 Lacy (disambiguation)

English feminine given names
English-language unisex given names
English-language surnames